Louis-Jean Cormier (born May 26, 1980 in Sept-Îles, Quebec) is a Canadian indie rock singer and songwriter. Formerly associated with the band Karkwa, since that band went on hiatus in 2012 he has recorded and performed as a solo artist and was a judge on the second season of the television singing competition La Voix.

While Cormier was with Karkwa, the band's fourth album Les Chemins de verre won the 2010 Polaris Music Prize, being the first French-language work to win the award.

His 2012 album Le Treizième étage was a longlisted nominee for the 2013 Polaris Music Prize, and won the Juno Award for Francophone Album of the Year at the Juno Awards of 2013. His 2015 album Les Grandes artères was a longlisted nominee for the 2015 Polaris Music Prize.

In early 2015, a group of 125 Québécois musicians and media personalities recorded a charity rendition of Cormier's single "Tout le monde en même temps" as a promotion for a public relations campaign to protect the Société Radio-Canada from funding cuts.

In 2016, he appeared as a duet vocalist on "J'aurai cent ans", the debut single by singer-songwriter Beyries.

In 2018, Cormier collaborated with Serge Fiori on Seul ensemble, a theatrical show comprising new rerecordings of Fiori's classic songs. The show had its theatrical debut in 2019.

Le Ciel est au plancher was a Juno Award nominee for Francophone Album of the Year at the Juno Awards of 2022.

Discography
Le Treizième étage (2012)
Les Grandes artères (2015)
Quand la nuit tombe (2020) (debuted at No. 24 in Canada)
Le ciel est au plancher (2021)

References

1980 births
Canadian indie rock musicians
Canadian rock singers
Canadian singer-songwriters
Living people
French-language singers of Canada
Singers from Quebec
People from Sept-Îles, Quebec
Juno Award for Francophone Album of the Year winners
Canadian Folk Music Award winners
21st-century Canadian male singers
Félix Award winners
Canadian male singer-songwriters